Acropora palmerae is a species of acroporid coral found in the northern Indian Ocean, the central Indo-Pacific, Australia, Southeast Asia, Japan, the East China Sea and the oceanic west Pacific Ocean. It is also found in Palau and the Mariana Islands, American Samoa, the Andaman Islands, the Great Barrier Reef, Okinawa Island, Mauritius, Micronesia, the Cook Islands and the Philippines. It was described by Wells in 1954.

Description
Its axial corallites are obvious but inconsistent, and it has mainly rasp-like radial corallites. The species is pink- or green-brown in colour. It looks similar to Acropora pinguis.

Distribution
It is classed as a vulnerable species on the IUCN Red List and it is believed that its population is decreasing; the species is also listed under Appendix II of CITES. Figures of its population are unknown, but is likely to be threatened by the global reduction of coral reefs, the increase of temperature causing coral bleaching, climate change, human activity, the crown-of-thorns starfish (Acanthaster planci) and disease. It occurs in the northern Indian Ocean, the central Indo-Pacific, Australia, Southeast Asia, Japan, the East China Sea and the oceanic west Pacific Ocean; it also occurs in Palau and the Mariana Islands, American Samoa, the Andaman Islands, the Great Barrier Reef, Okinawa Island, Mauritius, Micronesia, the Cook Islands and the Philippines.

Taxonomy
It was described as Acropora palmerae by Wells in 1954.

References

Acropora
Cnidarians of the Pacific Ocean
Fauna of the Indian Ocean
Marine fauna of Asia
Marine fauna of Oceania
Vulnerable fauna of Asia
Vulnerable fauna of Oceania
Animals described in 1954